Michael Gallagher (died 1984), sometimes referred to as Mike, Matthew, Matt or Mick Gallagher, was a footballer who played for Republic of Ireland and Hibernian.

Born in Arranmore, County Donegal, he played gaelic football with Rosses GAA club before he began his soccer career in Scotland.

He helped Hibernian win two Scottish League titles in 1950-51 and 1951-52 before being picked for the Republic of Ireland in March 1954 for what proved to be his only international appearance, a 1–0 win over Luxembourg in a World Cup qualifying game.

References

Year of birth missing
1984 deaths
Hibernian F.C. players
Republic of Ireland international footballers
Ayr United F.C. players
Scottish Football League players
Republic of Ireland association footballers
Alloa Athletic F.C. players
Association football wing halves
Weymouth F.C. players